

People
Rummel is the surname of:
Elizabeth Rummel (1897-1980), German-Canadian mountaineer and environmentalist
Franz Rummel (1853–1901), German pianist
 Henrik Rummel (born 1987), American rower
 Joseph Rummel (1876–1964), American Archbishop
 Martin Rummel (born 1974), Austrian cellist
 R. J. Rummel (1932–2014), American historian and political scientist
 Walter Morse Rummel (1887–1953), German-born French pianist

Other
 Archbishop Rummel High School, Metairie, Louisiana

 Bavarian Rummel, the 1703 Bavarian campaign in Tyrol

See also
 Rummel T